Athletics contests were held at the 2011 Parapan American Games from November 14 to 20 at the Telmex Athletics Stadium in Guadalajara, Mexico.

Medal summary

Medal table

Men's events

Women's events

References
2011 Parapan American Games – Athletics

Events at the 2011 Parapan American Games
Parapan American Games
2011